The Seventh-day Adventist Hymnal is the official hymnal of the Seventh-day Adventist Church and is widely used by English-speaking Adventist congregations. It consists of words and music to 695 hymns including traditional favorites from the earlier Church Hymnal that it replaced, American folk hymns, modern gospel songs, compositions by Adventists, contemporary hymns, and 224 congregational responsive Scripture readings.

Published in 1985 by Review and Herald Publishing Association, the hymnal has been through multiple printings and is available in various binding colors.

History
Although Adventist hymnals seem to have a lifetime of about it 25 years, by the early 1980s the existing hymnal had been in service since 1941.
The General Conference Music Committee created a diverse 19-member Church Hymnal Committee chaired by C.L. Brooks with Wayne Hooper as secretary.  As part of the process more than 3000 Adventist ministers were asked to rate the hymns of the then existing Church Hymnal.  Those that were commonly used were retained.  Songs that were added to the new hymnal include those of a more diverse and contemporary nature.

Earlier Adventist Hymnals
The hymnal was preceded by the following:
1869 Hymns and Tunes for Those Who Keep the Commandments of God and the Faith of Jesus
1886 The Seventh-day Adventist Hymn and Tune Book (Hymns and Tunes)
1908 Christ in Song
1941 The Church Hymnal

Adventist Songs

There are 695 songs and 225 scripture readings (SR).

Worship
Adoration and Praise: 1-38 (SR 696-708)
Morning worship: 39-45
Evening Worship: 46-58
Opening of Worship: 59-63
Close of Worship: 64-69

Trinity
Trinity: 70-73 (SR 709)

God the Father
Love of God: 74-81 (SR 710-713)
Majesty and Power of God: 82-91 (SR 714-716)
Power of God in Nature: 92-98 (SR 717-719)
Faithfulness of God: 99-104 (SR 720-725)
Grace and Mercy of God: 105-114 (SR 726-728)
lord, enthroned in heavenly splendor
sent forth by god's blessing
cover with his lif 88e
sweet by and by

Jesus Christ
First Advent: 115-117 (SR 729)
Birth: 118-143 (SR 730-731)
Life and Ministry: 144-153 (SR 732)
Sufferings and Death: 154-164 (SR 733-734)
Resurrection and Ascension: 165-176 (SR 735-737)
Priesthood: 177-180 (SR 738-739)
Love of Christ for Us: 181-199 (SR 740-745)
Second Advent: 200-221 (SR 746-747)
Kingdom and Reign: 222-227 (SR 748-751)
Sweet hour of prayer

Glory and Praise
Glory and Praise
 228-256

Holy Spirit
Holy Spirit: 257-270 (SR 752)

Holy Scriptures
Holy Scripture: 271-278 (SR 753-754)

Gospel
Invitation: 279-290 (SR 755)
Repentance: 291-296 (SR 756-757)
Forgiveness: 297-300 (SR 758)
Consecration: 301-331
Baptism: 332-333 (SR 759)
Salvation and Redemption: 334-343 (SR 760-766)

Christian Church
Community in Christ: 344-354 (SR 767)
Mission of the Church: 355-375 (SR 768)
Church Dedication: 376
Ordination: 377-378
Child Dedication: 379

Doctrines
Sabbath: 380-395 (SR 769-770)
Communion: 396-411 (SR 771-773)
Law and Grace: 412 (SR 774-775)
Spiritual Gifts: 413-414 (SR 776-777)
Judgement: 415-417 (SR 778-780)
Resurrection of the Saints: 418-419 (SR 781)
Eternal Life: 420-437 (SR 782-783)

Early Advent
Early Advent: 438-454

Christian Life
Our Love for God: 455-460 (SR 791)
Joy and Peace: 461-471 (SR 792-795)
Hope and Comfort: 472-477 (SR 796)
Meditation and Prayer: 478-505 (SR 797-798)
Faith and Trust: 506-535 (SR 799-800)
Guidance: 536-555 (SR 801-802)
Thankfulness: 556-566 (SR 803)
Humility: 567-570 (SR 804-805)
Loving Service: 571-584 (SR 806-810)
Love for One Another: 585-589 (SR 811-812)
Obedience: 590-591 (SR 813-814)
Watchfulness: 592-605 (SR 815-816)
Christian Warfare: 606-619 (SR 817)
Pilgrimage: 620-633 (SR 818-819)
Stewardship: 634-641 (SR 820-821)
Health and Wholeness: 642-644 (SR 822-824)
Love of Country: 645-649 (SR 825)

Christian Home
Love in the Home: 650-655 (SR 826-829)
Marriage: 656-659 (SR 830)

Sentences and Responses
Sentences and Responses: 660-695ppp

Worship Aids
Scripture Readings: 696-830
Canticles and Prayers: 831-844
Calls to Worship: 845-880
Words of Assurance: 881-893
Offertory Sentences: 894-907
Benedictions: 908-920

Companion Book
Companion to the Seventh-day Adventist Hymnal was authored by Wayne Hooper (musical co-editor of the hymnal) and Edward E. White. It contains the history of each hymn in the hymnal and biographical information on the composers and authors.

See also
Annie R. Smith
List of English-language hymnals by denomination

References

External links 
 "The Making of the Seventh-day Adventist Hymnal" by Wayne Hooper

Hymnals
Seventh-day Adventist media
1985 books
1985 in music
1985 in Christianity